The March 2013 Karachi bombing was a terrorist attack that struck a predominantly Shia area inside Abbas Town, Gulshan-e-Iqbal Town in Karachi, Pakistan on 3 March 2013. At least 48+ people were killed and more than 180+ others injured after a car bomb was detonated outside a Shia mosque mosque, just as locals were leaving after the evening's services. As rescuers gathered to the scene of the bombings, a second blast caused even more destruction. Authorities suspected the Sunni militant group Lashkar-e Jhangvi of being behind the attacks.

This was the first major incident within the city since a wave of target killings left more than 300 dead in the summer of 2011.

Arrest of suspects
Sindh police arrested three suspects involved in the blast, Shoaib Mehsud, Khalid Rehman Mehsud and Aurangzaib Mehsud. These are the members of Tehreek-e-Taliban Pakistan (TTP) and arrested during the targeted operation in Manghopir on 13 March 2013.

References 

2013 murders in Pakistan
21st-century mass murder in Pakistan
Terrorist incidents in Pakistan in 2013
Mass murder in 2013
History of Karachi (1947–present)
Car and truck bombings in Pakistan
2010s in Karachi
March 2013 events in Pakistan
Terrorist incidents in Karachi
Attacks on Shiite mosques in Pakistan
Mosque bombings in Pakistan